Vehicle ramming may refer to:
ram-raiding, a variation on burglary in which a vehicle is driven through the windows or doors of a closed shop so the perpetrators can loot it
traffic collisions
vehicle-ramming attack, deliberately ramming a motor vehicle into a building, crowd of people, or another vehicle